SAIPA Diesel Company, originally branded Iran Kaveh, is an Iranian-based manufacturer of trucks and trailers.

Beginnings

The company began operations in 1963 under an exclusive agreement with Mack Trucks to assemble their trucks and various types of trailers. By 1978, the factory was producing a total of 7,512 units.

During the years 1979-1984, the company began assembling a wider variety of vehicles in both the cargo and passenger sectors, in order to prevent the shutdown of the factory and make use of existing capacities. In 1984, having carried out studies on restarting the truck production line, a contract was concluded for the production of Volvo F4x2, 6x2, and 6x4 trucks. In the same year, another agreement was sealed with Goša (Gosha),  a former Yugoslavian company, to produce platform semi-trailers.

Since 2000

Environmental standards
Beginning in 2000, Iranian truck fleets running on international roads were being stopped at European frontiers due to their non-conformity to European environmental standards. SAIPA Diesel committed itself to helping international transportation companies out of their plight by introducing Volvo FH12 and NH12 trucks. Since 2001, they have been equipped with Euro II & III engines, meeting the European requirements, and Saipa has captured 90% of the local market share.

Updating technology
SAIPA Diesel has also taken on the responsibility of updating the Iranian truck fleets. Besides the production of heavy trucks, there was a need to fill the gap in light and medium trucks, which were mostly out-dated models. Volvo FM & Renault Midlum trucks were added to the range of the company's products.

Present & future
At present, SAIPA Diesel's annual production capacity is 20,000 units of different types of trucks and 6,000 units of various types of trailers and truck bodies. Several actions have contributed to the company's current position as domestic market leader.
 Investment and development of production and technology sections.
 Expanding subsidiary companies.
 Renovation of the domestic transportation fleets.
 Up-dating products to conform to standards worldwide.
 Establishment of an Integrated Workplace Management System.
 Gaining certificates in accordance with ISO 9001, ISO 14001 and OHSAS 18001.
 Introducing state-of-the-art midibuses and minibuses.

Products

Truck

 Volvo FH
 Volvo FM
 Volvo FMX
 Dongfeng Tianlong
 Budsun NB8
 Budsun
 Renault Midlum
 Foton
Renault D WIDE 6X2
Dongfeng KX480

Minibus
 Mahsun T18, Y21

Superstructures
 Tripper
 Firefighting
 Garbage Compactor
 Mixer
 Crane

Previous
 Renault R
 Renault B
 Renault FR1
 Renault PR100
 Renault R312

See also
 SAIPA
 Iranian cars

References

External links
 Saipa Diesel official site
 Saipa Diesel Co. Tehran company profile, news, and business information | HighBeam Business: Arrive Prepared
 Saipa Diesel, Dongfeng ink MOU
 Saipa Diesel Company: Private Company Information - Businessweek

Vehicle manufacturing companies established in 1963
Truck manufacturers of Iran
Manufacturing companies based in Tehran